Réginald Marie Garrigou-Lagrange  (21 February 1877 – 15 February 1964) was a French Dominican friar, philosopher and theologian. Garrigou-Lagrange was a gifted neo-Thomist theologian, recognized along with Édouard Hugon and Martin Grabmann as distinguished theologians of the 20th century. As professor at the Pontifical University of Saint Thomas Aquinas, he taught dogmatic and spiritual theology in Rome from 1909 to 1959. There he wrote his magnum opus, The Three Ages of the Interior Life ( Les trois âges de la vie intérieure) in 1938.

Life
Gontran-Marie Garrigou Lagrange was born in Auch, near Toulouse, France on 21 February, 1877. His father François Garrigou-Lagrange, was a civil servant. Lagrange was the relative of Henri Lasserre, a historian, through his mother, Cleménce Lasserre and his grand-uncle was Maurice-Marie-Matthieu Garrigou. Although Lagrange's family was Catholic, the young boy didn't show signs of remarkable piety as was seen in the late nineteenth-century of those who would later become saints. 

He went to many different schools but one of them was the lycée at Tarbes in which he studied philosophy for about a year. While studying at Tarbes, he wrote an essay on the problem of pain, in the essay he mentions the intellectual, moral and artistic advantages of suffering, but not the religious significance of suffering. After completing his final years in school, he began apprehending a vocation in medicine and thus he commenced his medical studies at the University of Bordeaux in 1896. While studying medicine at Bordeaux, he experienced what he described as a religious conversion after reading Life, Science, and Art by the Breton writer Ernest Hello (1828–85). He would later recall to his Dominican confrere, Rosaire Gagnebet:   

Lagrange went through a discernment process, this process led him to discern many religious orders but it culminated in him joining the Dominican Order; he joined the Dominicans of the Paris province at Amiens in the fall of 1897. Father Constant, a novice master, who plausibly educated Garrigou during his time in the novitiate was renowned to be an austere friar, but "one who greatly loved the Order and knew how to lead others to love it." In the Dominican Order, it was requisite for a novice to become a priest to continue his journey as a friar, thus after he finished his novitiate the young novice went to the studium in Flavigny to began his arduous philosophical and theological studies under Ambroise Gardeil to prepare for the priesthood. Lagrange and Gardeil shared a close relationship which would last until Gardeil died in 1938; Lagrange would forever be indebted to the man who shaped the intellectual career of the young Lagrange. Lagrange was ordained a priest on September 28, 1902 and was recognized by that time recognized as a shrew and able intellectual by his superior Gardeil.

While at the Sorbonne, Garrigou was able to attend lectures that included Emile Durkheim, Gabriel Seailles, and Lucien Levy-Bruhl; later in life, he would pint that he had been present at a lecture where Alfred Loisy rehearsed his trademark theme; "Jesus preached the kingdom of God, and it was the Church that came". As fate would have it, it was at the Sorbonne in which Garrigou would meet the young Bergsonian –  destined to become a major proponent of Thomism – Jacques Maritain where they would have a good relationship throughout the 1930s to 1940s. While Garrigou was teaching the history of philosophy, the studium moved many times because of the anticlerical laws of the administration of Emile Combes which would deeply effected Garrigou's political outlook.

In 1906, the deteriorating health of Etienne Hugueny caused him to resign from his post and Garrigou was called to ascend to the chair of dogmatic theology at Le Saulchoir. This change was a decisive moment in Garrigou's life which would allow him to devote himself to the study of philosophy for which he would relish. As a subsequent result of this change, Garrigou commenced his approfondissement in the works of Saint Thomas Aquinas and other Thomists who would guide him throughout his life. It was here where Garrigou wrote his first book, Le sens commun, la philosophie de l'etre et les formules domatiques, a critique of Eduard Le Roy attempt to interpret the dogmas of the church with a Bergsonian hermeneutic which led Le Roy to downplay the Church's emphasis on radical dogmatic continuity throughout history. In 1909, Master General Hyacinthe Cormier recognized his abilities and assigned him to the Angelicum where he continued teaching dogmatic theology until his retirement in 1959. In 1917 a special professorship in ascetical and mystical theology was created for him at the Angelicum, the first of its kind anywhere in the world. 

As Garrigou began to lose energy, he was moved to the priory of Santa Sabina in Rome subsequently moved to the Fraternitè Sacerdotale Canadienne and died there on February 15, 1964. Benoit Lavaud said:

Thought
He is best known for his spiritual theology. His magnum opus in the field is The Three Ages of the Interior Life (Les trois ages de la vie intérieure), in which he propounded the thesis that infused contemplation and the resulting mystical life are in the normal way of holiness of Christian perfection. This influenced the section entitled "Chapter V: The Universal Call to Holiness in the Church" in the Second Vatican Council's Dogmatic Constitution on the Church, Lumen gentium.

His great achievement was to synthesize the highly abstract writings of St Thomas Aquinas with the experiential writings of St. John of the Cross, attempting to show they are in perfect harmony with each other.

Father Garrigou-Lagrange, the leading proponent of "strict observance Thomism", attracted wider attention when in 1946 he wrote against the Nouvelle Théologie theological movement, criticizing elements of it as Modernist.

He is also said to be the drafter of Pope Pius XII's 1950 encyclical Humani generis, subtitled "Concerning Some False Opinions Threatening to Undermine the Foundations of Catholic Doctrine".

In politics, like many neo-scholastic theologians of his time, Garrigou-Lagrange was a strong supporter of the far-right movement Action Française and he also sympathized with Vichy France. In 1941 he praised the French collaborationist regime and its Chief of State Pétain in a letter written to his former disciple Jacques Maritain: "I am entirely with the Marshal, I see him as the Father of the patrie, blessed with a good sense verging on genius, and as a truly providential man".

Influence
L'Osservatore Romano of 9–10 December 1950 lists Garrigou-Lagrange among the names of the preparatory commission for the definition of the Assumption of Mary.

Garrigou-Lagrange taught many eminent Catholic theologians during his academic career at the Angelicum. He also supervised the doctoral research of Marie-Dominique Chenu, who was ordained in 1919 and completed his doctorate in theology in 1920 with a dissertation entitled De contemplatione. In the period between World War II and the Cold War Garrigou-Lagrange was the "torchbearer of orthodox Thomism" against Modernism.  In 1926 he served as the definitive consulter to Pope Pius XI in declaring John of the Cross a doctor of the church.

He is commonly held to have influenced the decision in 1942 to place the privately circulated book Une école de théologie: le Saulchoir (Étiolles 1937) by Marie-Dominique Chenu, O.P., on the Vatican's "Index of Forbidden Books" as the culmination of a polemic within the Dominican Order between the Angelicum supporters of a speculative scholasticism and the French revival Thomists who were more attentive to historical hermeneutics.

Garrigou-Lagrange gave the retreat in Paris which attracted Yves Congar to leave the diocesan seminary in order to join the Dominicans. Later, Congar's methodology was suspected of Modernism because it seemed to derive more from religious experience than from syllogistic analysis.

Garrigou-Lagrange also supervised the doctoral research of Maurice Zundel who completed his dissertation in 1927 with a dissertation entitled L'Influence du nominalisme sur la pensée chrétienne.

Perhaps the most famous of his students was the future Pope John Paul II, who was supervised by Garrigou-Lagrange for his doctoral research in the mid-1940s at the Angelicum, and whose encyclical Fides et Ratio is attributed to his training under the learned Dominican.

He died on 15 February 1964 in Rome. The International Dominican Foundation (IDF) established Réginald de Rocquois Foundation in his memory at Pontifical University of Saint Thomas Aquinas where he taught most of his career, which grants annual Réginald de Rocquois scholarships.

Works
He produced 28 books and hundreds of articles. Among the most famous works are:
Commentaries on the Summa Theologica of Thomas Aquinas

The One God, commentary on Summa Theologica I.1-26.
The Trinity and God the Creator, commentary on Summa Theologica I.27-119.
Beatitude (1951), commentary on Summa Theologica I-II.1-54.
Grace (1947), commentary on Summa Theologica I-II.109-114. scanned version.
The Theological Virtues - Vol. 1: Faith (1948, English retranslation scheduled for 2018), commentary on Summa Theologica II-II.1-16.
Christ the Saviour (1945), commentary on Summa Theologica III.1-26, 31-59.
De Eucharistia (1943, English trans. scheduled for 2018)

Theological works
Christian Perfection and Contemplation according to St Thomas Aquinas and St John of the Cross (1923)
God, His Existence and Nature: A Thomistic Solution of Certain Agnostic Antinomies (1914)
See also Pierre Duhem's appendix to it: "Note sure la valeur des principes de l'inertie et de la conservation de l'énergie"
Life Everlasting
 The Sense of Mystery: Clarity and Obscurity in the Intellectual Life (trans. 2017, publ. by Emmaus Academic), French original: Le sens du mystère et le clair-obsur intellectuel (1934)
Life Everlasting and Immensity of the Soul (1947)
The Love of God and the Cross of Jesus (1929)
Predestination (1936)
The Priest in Union with Christ (1948)
Providence (1932)
Our Saviour and His Love for Us (1933)
The Three Ages of the Interior Life: Prelude of Eternal Life (1938), synthesis of Christian Perfection and Contemplation and Love of God and the Cross of Jesus (online)
The Three Ways of the Spiritual Life (1938)
Essenza e attualità del tomismo (1945) 
 On Divine Revelation: The Teaching of the Catholic Faith  (trans. 2022, publ. by Emmaus Academic), Latin original: De Revelatione per Ecclesiam Catholicam proposita (final edition in 1950)
Principles of Catholic Apologetics, translated (in abridged form) and rearranged by Thomas Joseph Walshe from Fr. Reginald Garrigou-Lagrange's De Revelatione (see below)

Marian works
The Mother of the Saviour and our Interior Life (1948)

Philosophical works
Reality: A Synthesis of Thomistic Thought Hardcover. Free Audiobook.
Le sens commun: la philosophie de l’être et les formules dogmatiques (4th ed., 1936).  English translation as Thomistic Common Sense: The Philosophy of Being and the Development of Doctrine (2021, Emmaus Academic)
Le realism du principe de finalité (1932).  English translation as The Order of Things: The Realism of the Principle of Finality (2020, Emmaus Academic)
Philosophizing in Faith: The Beginning and End of Wisdom Volume of collected, annotated, and translated articles, published by Cluny Media in 2019

Works in Latin (originals)
De Revelatione per Ecclesiam Catholicam proposita – Theologia Fundamentalis secundum S. Thomae Doctrinam (Volume I & Volume II)
Works in Spanish (translated)
Dios: Su existencia solución tomista de las antinomias agnósticas (Volumen I & Volumen II)
El realismo del principio de finalidad
El Salvador y su amor por nosotros
El Sentido Común (Original in French: Le sens commun)
El Sentido del Misterio
La Madre del Salvador y nuestra vida interior
La Predestinacion de los Santos y la Gracia
La providencia y la confianza en Dios
La Santificacion del Sacerdote
La síntesis tomista
Las tres edades de la vida interior
La Unión del sacerdote con Cristo Sacerdote y Victima
La vida eterna y La profundidad del alma

Other

Complete bibliography
Nearly all his works in Latin, English, French, Italian, and Spanish are downloadable here.

See also
 Consecration and entrustment to Mary

References

Further reading

External links
"A Saint in Heaven" by Fr. Thomas Crean, O.P.
 Audiobook of his Reality, digitally read at a fast pace
 Complete bibliography of all his works 
 The Last Battle of Lagrange by Fr. Albert Kallio, O.P.
 An obituary, by his disciple, Fr Marie-Rosaire Gagnebet, O.P. (in French)

1877 births
1964 deaths
20th-century French Catholic theologians
20th-century Christian mystics
Aristotelian philosophers
Anti-Masonry
French anti-communists
French Dominicans
French male writers
French Christian mystics
French philosophers
French religious writers
Philosophers of religion
Academic staff of the Pontifical University of Saint Thomas Aquinas
Roman Catholic mystics
Catholic philosophers
Thomists